Edward B. Stratton, often known as E.B. Stratton, was an American architect based in Boston.  Several of his works are listed on the U.S. National Register of Historic Places.
He was born in Chelsea, Boston Chelsea, Massachusetts and went to Chelsea and Boston schools.  He studied at least briefly at MIT and "at an atelier in Paris".
Works include:
Hotel Puritan
Hotel Somerset
Hotel Lenox
Swampscott Country Club
Police Annex, West Newton
Casa De Josefina, 2 mi. SE of Lake Wales off U.S. 27 Lake Wales, FL (Stratton, Edward B.), NRHP-listed
Edward B. Stratton House, 25 Kenmore St. Newton, MA (Stratton, Edward B.), NRHP-listed
Vermont Building (1904), 6-12 Thacher St. Boston, MA, Chicago school/Early Commercial architecture. (Arthur H. Bowditch and Edward B. Stratton), NRHP-listed
90 Commonwealth Avenue (designed by Edward B. Stratton and George Nelson Jacobs), a nine-story 24-unit apartment building
Gurley Building (1924), Stamford, Connecticut, also known as Valeur Building, an eight-story tall, narrow building.  "Sullivanesque"; designed by Edward B. Stratton and built by Clinton Cruikshank.  Included in the NRHP-listed Downtown Stamford Historic District, (see ).

He designed numerous buildings in the Longwood, Fisher Hill, and Chestnut Hill areas of Boston.

References 

Year of birth missing
Year of death missing
Architects from Boston
Chicago school architects